Zazie in the Metro is the English translation of Zazie dans le Métro.  It can refer to:

 Zazie dans le Métro (novel), a 1959 novel by Raymond Queneau
 Zazie dans le Métro (film), a 1960 film and adaptation of the novel